Events during the year 1960 in Northern Ireland.

Incumbents
 Governor - 	The Lord Wakehurst 
 Prime Minister - Basil Brooke

Events
16 March – Passenger liner  is launched at the Harland and Wolff shipyard in Belfast (for P&O).
6 April – Short SC.1 VTOL research aircraft makes its first transition from vertical to horizontal flight and back, flying from Belfast Harbour Airport.
13 April – MV Arlanza becomes the last passenger liner launched by Harland and Wolff in Belfast (for Royal Mail Line).

Arts and literature
26 January – First staging of Sam Thompson's play Over the Bridge, at the Empire Theatre, Belfast.
13–18 February - Orson Welles opens for the last time in a stage production, his adaptation Chimes at Midnight with the Gate Theatre Company, at the Grand Opera House, Belfast (transferring in March to Dublin).

Sport

Football
Irish League
Winners: Glenavon

Irish Cup
Winners: Linfield 5 - 1 Ards

Births
23 April – Barry Douglas, classical pianist.
30 April – Colonel Tim Collins, British Commander in Iraq.
6 May – Roma Downey, actress and producer. 
13 May – Michael Savage, Liberal Party of Canada Member of Parliament.
8 June – Peter Heather, historian.
7 July – Billy Wright, leader of the Loyalist Volunteer Force (died 1997).
20 August – Deirdre Madden, author.
27 August – Mark Caughey, footballer.
29 August
Dominic Bradley, SDLP MLA.
Thomas Burns, SDLP MLA.
10 October – Arlene McCarthy, Labour Party Member of the European Parliament.
25 November – Robert Dunlop, motorcycle racer (died 2008).
10 December – Kenneth Branagh, actor and director.

Full date unknown
Ian McDonald, science fiction novelist.
Jeff McWhinney, deaf community activist.

Deaths
9 March – Jack Beattie, Labour politician (born 1886).
13 June – Ken McArthur, winner of the marathon race at the 1912 Summer Olympics for South Africa (born 1881).
20 July – Galbraith Lowry-Corry, 7th Earl Belmore, soldier and Deputy Lieutenant for County Fermanagh (born 1913).
1 September – Robert Moore, minister of religion and politician (born 1886).
25 October – Harry Ferguson, early aviator and developer of the modern agricultural tractor (born 1884).

See also
1960 in Scotland
1960 in Wales

References